Greg Isdaner (born February 25, 1987) is a former American football guard. He was signed by the Dallas Cowboys as an undrafted free agent in 2009. He played college football at West Virginia.

Isdaner has also been a member of the Philadelphia Eagles and Hartford Colonials.

Professional career

Dallas Cowboys
Isdaner announced he would forgo his senior season and enter the 2009 NFL Draft. Isdaner worked out at the 2009 NFL Combine, however he went undrafted in the NFL Draft.

Philadelphia Eagles
Isdaner was signed to the Philadelphia Eagles' practice squad on November 25. He was released on December 8. He was re-signed to the practice squad on December 28. His practice squad contract expired at the conclusion of the 2009 season. He was re-signed to a three-year contract by the Eagles on May 4, 2010. He was waived on August 28.

Current life
Isdaner was signed by the Hartford Colonials on September 3, 2010. He was released on July 15, 2011. Isdaner currently coaches The Haverford School For Boys in PA.

References

External links
Philadelphia Eagles bio
West Virginia Mountaineers bio

1987 births
Living people
People from Lower Merion Township, Pennsylvania
Players of American football from Pennsylvania
American football offensive guards
West Virginia Mountaineers football players
Dallas Cowboys players
Philadelphia Eagles players
Hartford Colonials players
Episcopal Academy alumni